The Newton Campus Soccer Field is the on-campus soccer and lacrosse stadium at Boston College in Newton, Massachusetts.

The 1,800 person capacity stadium was built in 1999. The current tenants are the Boston College Eagles men's & women's soccer teams and Boston College Eagles women's lacrosse.

Renovations
Prior to the 2003 season, lights were added to the field.  In 2008, the turf was switched from natural grass to AstroTurf, and this AstroTurf was upgraded again in 2014.

See also
Boston College Eagles
Boston College Eagles men's soccer
Boston College Eagles women's soccer
Boston College Eagles women's lacrosse

References

1999 establishments in Massachusetts
Boston College Eagles lacrosse
Boston College Eagles soccer
Boston College Eagles sports venues
College soccer venues in the United States
Soccer venues in Massachusetts
Sports venues in Middlesex County, Massachusetts
Sports venues completed in 1999